The 1975 Women's European Volleyball Championship was the ninth edition of the event, organised by Europe's governing volleyball body, the Confédération Européenne de Volleyball. It was hosted in several cities in Yugoslavia from 18 to 25 October 1975, with the final round held in Belgrade.

Participating teams

Format
The tournament was played in two different stages. In the first stage, the twelve participants were divided into three groups of four teams each. In the second stage, two groups were formed, one containing the winners and runners-up from all first stage groups (six teams in total) to contest the tournament title. A second group was formed by the remaining six teams which played for position places (7th to 12th). All groups in both stages played a single round-robin format.

Pools composition

Squads

Venues

Preliminary round

Pool 1
venue location: Rijeka, Yugoslavia

|}

|}

Pool 2
venue location: Banja Luka, Yugoslavia

|}

|}

Pool 3
venue location: Negotin, Yugoslavia

|}

|}

Final round
venue location: Belgrade, Yugoslavia

7th–12th pool

|}

|}

Final pool

|}

|}

Final ranking

References
 Confédération Européenne de Volleyball (CEV)

External links
 Results at todor66.com

European Volleyball Championships
Volleyball Championship
V
Women's European Volleyball Championships
October 1975 sports events in Europe
1975 in Serbia
Women's volleyball in Yugoslavia
International sports competitions in Belgrade
1970s in Belgrade